Ricochet is a 1991 American action  crime thriller film, directed by Russell Mulcahy, written by Steven E. de Souza, and starring Denzel Washington, John Lithgow, Ice-T, Kevin Pollak, and Lindsay Wagner. The film details a struggle between a Los Angeles district attorney (Washington) and a vengeful criminal (Lithgow) whom he arrested when he was a cop.

Plot 
In 1983, rookie Los Angeles police officer and law student Nick Styles (Denzel Washington) meets Alice (Victoria Dillard), and drifts away from childhood friend Odessa (Ice-T), who has become a drug dealer in South Central Los Angeles. Styles and his partner Larry Doyle (Kevin Pollak) patrol a carnival, where they encounter hitman Earl Talbot Blake (John Lithgow) and his accomplice Kim (Josh Evans). Styles is forced into an armed standoff when Blake takes a hostage after killing several drug dealers. After stripping his equipment and uniform off, Styles uses a gun hidden in his athletic supporter, shooting Blake in the knee and subduing him. The incident is caught on camera by an amateur videographer and televised, making Styles a hero. He and Doyle are promoted to Detective, while Blake and Kim are sent to prison.

Eight years later in 1991, Styles has become an Assistant District Attorney and is married to Alice with two daughters. Behind bars, Blake allies himself with the Aryan Brotherhood to plot an escape and take revenge against Styles. Kim is paroled and assists in Blake's escape. Blake and the AB members stage a violent and deadly prison escape during a parole hearing, which only Blake and the AB leader survive. Afterwards, Blake murders the AB gang leader and burns his corpse; however, while in prison, he had swapped their dental records, in order to fake his own death and ensure authorities would believe that Blake had died in the fire.

Styles finds Odessa, now a major drug dealer in the neighborhood, and pleads with him to halt dealing to children. Blake and Kim kill a city councilman who works with Styles, dressing his body in drag, planting child pornography in his briefcase and staging his death to look like a suicide, framing Styles for embezzling city funds. Blake and Kim abduct Styles outside his home and hold him hostage in an empty swimming pool for several days. They regularly inject Styles with heroin and cocaine while engaging in arm wrestling. Blake hires a prostitute (Linda Dona) to have sex with Styles. She ignores the weakened Styles' objections and rapes him as Blake records the incident on video. After Blake and Kim deposit an unconscious Styles on the steps of City Hall, Alice overhears Styles' superiors telling him he has tested positive for gonorrhea, and believes he is cheating on her.

Styles witnesses a video of Blake entering his daughters' room with a hatchet. Styles heads to the park where his family are watching a circus act, and holds a black-clad figure he believes to be Blake at gunpoint; the figure turns out to be a clown, making Styles seem unstable. Blake releases the recording of Styles' rape, making it appear as if Styles is soliciting prostitutes. District Attorney Priscilla Brimleigh (Lindsay Wagner) suspends Styles.

With Styles determined to get his name cleared, Styles and Doyle beat information out of one of Blake's former AB allies. In an alley, Blake fatally shoots Doyle and plants Styles' fingerprints on the gun.

Desperate, Styles contacts Odessa for help, bringing his family to the housing project Odessa uses as a drug lab. On the roof, Styles raves to the street below, apparently suicidal; this draws out Blake, who wants Styles to live a long, miserable life. Styles fakes his own death by escaping an explosion in the building.

Odessa's gang abducts Kim, and Odessa sends a message to Blake that Styles is alive and intends to find him, challenging him to come to the Watts Towers. Blake finds Kim tied to the scaffolding and kills him. On the towers, Blake and Styles fight until Odessa applies electricity to the metal tower, electrocuting Blake.  Styles pulls Blake off the tower and as he falls, impales himself on a spike. Styles reunites with his family and calls out to Odessa one last time, inviting him to basketball. Television news crews broadcast the dramatic turn of events, declaring Styles innocent. When a newscaster (Mary Ellen Trainor) asks Styles for comment, he turns off the news camera.

Cast 
 Denzel Washington as Assistant District Attorney Nick Styles
 John Lithgow as Earl Talbot Blake
 Ice-T as Odessa
 Lydell M. Cheshier as R.C., Odessa's second In Command
 Kevin Pollak as Lieutenant Larry Doyle
 Lindsay Wagner as District Attorney Priscilla "The Hun" Brimleigh
 Matt Landers as Chief Elliott Floyd
 Sherman Howard as Public Defender Kiley
 Josh Evans as "Kim" Kimble
 Mary Ellen Trainor as Gail Wallens, the character she portrayed in Die Hard
 Victoria Dillard as Alice Styles
 Kimberly Natasha Ali as Lisa Styles
 Aileaha Jones as Monica Styles
 John Amos as Reverend Styles
 Starletta DuPois as Mrs. Styles
 John Cothran, Jr. as Councilman U.B. Farris
 Miguel Sandoval as Vargas, Drug Dealer
 Thomas Rosales Jr. as Gonzalo, Drug Dealer
 George Cheung as Huey, Drug Dealer
 Kenny Endoso as Liu, Drug Dealer
 Rick Cramer as Jesse Schultzman, Head of The Aryan Brotherhood.
 Jesse Ventura as Jake Chewalski, Blake's Cellmate and Aryan Brotherhood Member.
 Linda Dona as Wanda, Prostitute Hired By Blake to Frame Nick.

Production 
Originally, the screenplay to Ricochet by Fred Dekker was written as a Dirty Harry film, but Clint Eastwood deemed it too grim. When the script was attached to Joel Silver as producer in a different direction, Dekker met Kurt Russell about starring while Dekker was to be director, which it never was able to reach in its pre-production stage.

Reportedly, violent scenes in the film were heavily cut down following the test screenings. According to interview with director Russell Mulcahy, in one of the scenes that were cut out Blake physically abuses Styles until Styles vomits, and Blake gets a sponge to clean him up. This is why Styles has vomit on him when he is found in the streets. The uncut version of the film was never released.

Music

The score of the film was composed, produced, and conducted by Alan Silvestri. Like Predator 2, it was performed by the Skywalker Symphony Orchestra.

Reception 

On review aggregation website Rotten Tomatoes, the film has a score of 74% based on 19 reviews, with an average rating of 5.7/10. On Metacritic, the film has a weighted average score of 49 based on 17 critics, indicating "mixed or average reviews". Audiences polled by CinemaScore gave the film an average grade of "B" on an A+ to F scale.

Gene Siskel and Roger Ebert gave the film two thumbs down on their show At the Movies, describing it as ridiculous, goofy, embarrassing, unsavory and distasteful but also stylish, ambitious and having some smart dialogue.

Box office 
The movie had a modest box office. It premiered on October 4, 1991, making $4,831,181 in its opening weekend, 2nd behind The Fisher King, ending up grossing over $21 million in its theatrical run. It also came 5 weeks prior to the premiere of Cape Fear, a film starring Robert De Niro and Nick Nolte with a similar storyline.

References

External links 
 
 

1991 films
1991 action thriller films
1991 crime thriller films
1990s psychological thriller films
Films scored by Alan Silvestri
Fictional portrayals of the Los Angeles Police Department
American films about revenge
Films directed by Russell Mulcahy
Films produced by Joel Silver
Films set in 1983
Films set in 1991
Films set in Los Angeles
Hood films
American neo-noir films
Silver Pictures films
Warner Bros. films
African-American films
Films with screenplays by Steven E. de Souza
1990s English-language films
1990s American films